Poison In Jest, first published in 1932, is a detective story by John Dickson Carr which does not feature any of Carr's series detectives.  This novel is a mystery of the type known as a whodunnit.

Plot summary

Jeff Marle, who plays a sidekick role in other Carr novels, is visiting a friend at the Quayle mansion in western Pennsylvania.  Although various members of the Quayle household hate each other, all are united in hatred of the paterfamilias, Judge Quayle.  A few moments after being introduced to Marle, Judge Quayle collapses after having been poisoned.  More than one poison is used in murder attempts in the household; strange shadowy figures are seen prowling the halls at night, and there is a creepy story about a marble hand that was broken from a statue of Caligula which apparently creeps around the house on its own.  After the first two deaths, a young friend of the family, Rossiter, takes a hand in detecting, with the aid of Jeff Marle; Rossiter identifies the murderer.

1932 American novels
Novels by John Dickson Carr
Novels set in Pennsylvania
Hamish Hamilton books
Harper & Brothers books